Diuris disposita, commonly called the Macleay River doubletail or Willawarrin doubletail, is a species of orchid which is endemic to a small area in New South Wales. It has one or two linear leaves at its base and up to seven yellow flowers with brown markings. Only about fifty plants survive in grassy forest near Kempsey.

Description
Flowering occurs in September and October.<ref name="RBGS">{{cite web|title=Diuris disposita|url=http://plantnet.rbgsyd.nsw.gov.au/cgi-bin/NSWfl.pl?page=nswfl&lvl=sp&name=Diuris~disposita|publisher=Royal Botanic Garden Sydney|accessdate=18 March 2018}}</ref>

Taxonomy and namingDiuris disposita was first formally described in 1991 by David Jones from a specimen collected near north-west of Kempsey and the description was published in Australian Orchid Research. The specific epithet (disposita) is a Latin word meaning "distributed" or "arranged", referring to the widely spaced flowers on the flowering stem.

Distribution and habitat
The Macleay River doubletail grows in grassy open forest near the Macleay River north-west of Kempsey.

ConservationDiuris disposita is classified as "endangered" under the New South Wales Biodiversity Conservation Act 2016''. The main threats to the species are illegal collecting, habitat destruction and inappropriate fire regimes. Fewer than fifty plants are known, none in a conservation reserve.

References

disposita
Endemic orchids of Australia
Orchids of New South Wales
Plants described in 1991